Richard Steven Russell (born 22 January 1968) is an Australian cricketer. He played four first-class matches for Western Australia between 1989/90 and 1993/94.

See also
 List of Western Australia first-class cricketers

References

External links
 

1968 births
Living people
Australian cricketers
Western Australia cricketers